Yang Yichen (March 31, 1914 – June 28, 1997) was a politician of the People's Republic of China.

Biography
Yang Yichen was born in Faku County, Liaoning in 1914.

After the Cultural Revolution, Yang was the Secretary of the CPC Heilongjiang Committee. He was the Procurator-General of the Supreme People's Procuratorate from 1983 to 1988.

Yang was a member of the 11th and 12th CPC Central Committee from 1977 to 1987.

Yang Yichen died in Beijing on June 28, 1997.

Notes

1914 births
1997 deaths
People's Republic of China politicians from Liaoning
Chinese Communist Party politicians from Liaoning
Politicians from Shenyang
Governors of Heilongjiang
Procurator-General of the Supreme People's Procuratorate